Mirhan Hussein Bassyouni Ahmed is an Egyptian singer and actress. She was born in Cairo on 28 October. She gained her popularity through the Arabic version of the reality talent show Star Academy during the 5th season, representing Egypt in 2008. Before Star Academy Mirhan Hussein studied travel and tourism and then worked in an advertising agency. She loves drawing and singing. Her talent is comprehensive as she has proven her ability to sing, dance, act and present programs.

Career 
Due to her success on Star Academy 5, Mirhan and 6 other candidates were chosen to be part of the Star Academy Tour.

References

External links 
 
 

Living people
1982 births
21st-century Egyptian actresses
Star Academy participants